Motion Picture Funnies Weekly is a 36-page American comic book created in 1939, and designed to be a promotional giveaway in movie theaters. While the idea proved unsuccessful, and only a handful of sample copies of issue #1 were printed, the periodical is historically important for introducing the enduring Marvel Comics character Namor the Sub-Mariner, created by writer-artist Bill Everett.

Production history
Motion Picture Funnies Weekly was produced by First Funnies, Inc., one of the 1930s–1940s Golden Age of comic books "packagers" that would create outsourced comics on demand for publishers. The company, founded by Centaur Publications art director Lloyd Jacquet and later named Funnies Inc., planned to be a publisher itself, with Motion Picture Funnies Weekly as its initial product. While the postal indicia gives the publisher as First Funnies, Inc., the back cover, a house ad, directs interested parties to contact Funnies, Inc.

The comic, with black-and-white pages and a color cover and designed to be distributed to children in movie theaters, was never published, although samples were printed to show theater-owners. Either eight or nine samples exist (sources differ). All but one were discovered at the late Jacquet's estate sale in 1974. One sample, dubbed the "Pay Copy", contains written payment information for the various creators who contributed to the comic. Additionally, proof sheets were found there for the covers of issues #2–4.

The discovery of the hitherto forgotten Motion Picture Funnies Weekly rewrote an early part of the history of comics, and caused a sensation at the time. Marvel Comics, in 1978, describing the creation of its superhero the Sub-Mariner, wrote:

The "Comic Books on Microfiche" collection of the University of Tulsa's McFarlin Library lists Centaur Publications' Amazing Man Comics #5 (Sept. 1939), the premiere issue, as continuing the numbering of Motion Picture Funnies Weekly, but this is unconfirmed.

No copy was filed with the Library of Congress.

Contents

The first issue included Bill Everett's original eight-page Sub-Mariner origin story, which was expanded by four pages when it eventually saw print in Marvel Comics #1 (Oct. 1939) – the first publication of Marvel Comics' Golden Age predecessor, Timely Comics, the contents for which were supplied by Funnies, Inc. The final panel on page 8 contained a box reading "Continued Next Week", as well as a notation indicating an April 1939 date for the art. The box remained, sans words and colored in, when reprinted as part of the 12-page story in Marvel Comics #1 (Oct. 1939), and reprinted as the original eight-page story in Marvel's The Invaders #20 (Sept. 1977). As historian Les Daniels writes,

Another Timely character that debuted in Motion Picture Funnies Weekly was writer-artist Paul J. Lauretta's aviator hero the American Ace, whose origin eventually appeared in two six-page stories in Marvel Mystery Comics #2–3 (Dec. 1939 – Jan. 1940), following the renaming of Marvel Comics after issue #1.

Additional features in Motion Picture Funnies Weekly #1 were "Spy Ring", starring a masked, non-costumed crimefighter, the Wasp, drawn and likely written by Arthur Pinajian under the pseudonym Jay Fletcher and reprinted as the feature "The Wasp" and the story titled "The Spy Ring Case" in Silver Streak Comics #1 (Dec. 1939); "Kar Toon and his Copy Cat" by Martin Filchok, and an activity page, "Fun-o-graphs," by Vernon Miller, both reprinted in Pelican Publications' Green Giant Comics #1 (1940); and "Jolly the Newsie" by George Peter.

Cartoonist Fred Schwab drew the cover. Another cartoonist, Martin Filchock, drew the covers of #2 and #4, and Max Neill the cover of #3, with each of these latter covers signed by the artist.

Notes

References

External links
Martin Filchock (Phil Chalk, Martin Chock, Frank Filchock) at the Lambiek Comiclopedia. Archived from the original November 8, 2011

Comics magazines published in the United States
1939 comics debuts
1939 comics endings
Humor comics
Golden Age comics titles